The COW 37 mm gun was a British automatic cannon that was developed during First World War as a large-calibre aircraft weapon. It was tested in several installations and specified for the Westland C.O.W. Gun Fighter for attacking bombers. The tests did not yield satisfactory results and the weapon did not enter general service except on a few flying boats. The design was later adapted as the basis of the Vickers S, which saw some service during the Second World War as an anti-armour weapon.

Design and development
Coventry Ordnance Works had been set up in 1905 by a consortium of British shipbuilding firms (John Brown, Cammell Laird and Fairfield) to compete with the duopoly of Vickers and Armstrong-Whitworth in producing naval guns. Besides the larger naval gun, COW worked at the smaller end on anti-aircraft guns. There was a demand for a weapon that could be mounted on an aircraft. Their first attempt at an automatic gun was a "1-pounder" (the nominal weight of the shell) from a rimless 37x94 cartridge. This developed into a 1½-pounder using a longer 37x190 cartridge in a five-round clip. The gun was ready to produce only as the First World War came to an end and was only in service briefly, having been fitted to a pair of Airco DH4s.

After the war it was used in a number of different aircraft, mostly flying boats such as the Blackburn Perth, where it was seen as being effective against small vessels. The Air Ministry also requested fighter designs based around the weapon, such as the Westland C.O.W. Gun Fighter, the Vickers Type 161 and the unsuccessful Bristol Bagshot heavy fighter.

After Vickers acquired the Coventry Ordnance Works, the COW 37 mm was used for the development of the 40 mm Vickers S gun which was used by Hawker Hurricanes as an anti-tank weapon. In the Second World War, COW guns were used as the armament for the Mk III version of the Armadillo armoured fighting vehicle, the COW gun with its shield mounted on the rear part of the flatbed. The vehicle was used by the RAF Regiment and later by the Home Guard.

Use

Specification 4/24
 Westland Westbury - One in trainable mount, one fixed mounting
 Bristol Bagshot - Two in trainable mountings

Specification F9/27
 Westland C.O.W. Gun Fighter One in fixed mounting
 Vickers Type 161 - One in fixed mounting

Flying boats
 Armstrong Whitworth Sinaia
 Short Cromarty
 Vickers Valentia - tested
 Blackburn Iris
 Short Sarafand
 Blackburn Perth - fitted
 Short Sunderland - planned but not fitted

See also
 QF 1 pounder pom-pom

Notes

References
 I.V. Hogg & L.F. Thurston, British Artillery Weapons & Ammunition 1914–1918. London: Ian Allan, 1972
 "Armament" Flight 28 June 1934 p640

External links
 "THE CANNON PIONEERS", by Anthony G Williams
 "Fighter Armament", 24 August 1950, Flight magazine page 218
 "Flying Battleships" Popular Science, December 1934, page 36 & page 37 show COW 37mm cannon
 "C.O.W. 37mm cannon fitted to Blackburn Perth flying boat" YouTube, shown being fired while moored on water

Aircraft guns
Autocannon
Coventry Ordnance Works
37 mm artillery